Venkat Sunderam is an Indian former first-class cricketer who played for Delhi and Tamil Nadu. After his playing career, he became a selector for Delhi and pitch committee chairman for the Board of Control for Cricket in India (BCCI).

Career
Sunderam was a left-handed opening batsman who played for Delhi between the 1970/71 and 1980/81 seasons and one season for Tamil Nadu in 1973/74. He was the leading run-getter of the 1977–78 Ranji Trophy with 608 runs at an average of 86.85 including three centuries. His personal best score of 177 came in the 1977–78 Irani Cup for Rest of India against Bombay. He was part of the Delhi team in its back-to-back Ranji wins in 1978/79 and 1979/80. His last first class match was for Delhi in the 1980–81 Irani Cup against Rest of India which Delhi won on first innings lead.

Sunderam was a team manager for India in the 1990s. He became a member of the ten-member selection committee of Delhi in 2002 and a member of the five-member Delhi selection panel in 2005. He was also the pitch committee chairman for BCCI. He was Delhi District Cricket Association's curator, a position he quit in 2014. As of December 2015, he is the executive secretary of the Shahid Vijay Singh Pathik Sports Complex in Greater Noida.

References

External links
 
 

Living people
Date of birth missing (living people)
Indian cricketers
Delhi cricketers
Tamil Nadu cricketers
North Zone cricketers
Year of birth missing (living people)